Kullar Dam (Malayalam: കുള്ളാർ അണക്കെട്ട്) is a small flanking dam which impounds Kullar river in Seethathode village, Pathanamthitta District in Kerala, India. The Dam was built as a part of Sabarigiri Hydroelectric Project. The release from the dam flows to Pamba River and from there it flows through Ranni, Konni, Kozhencherry, Thiruvalla, Chengannur, Kuttanadu, Mavelikara and Karthikappally taluks.

It is a Concrete Gravity dam with  height and  length. Construction of the dam was completed in 1990.

Specifications
Latitude : 9⁰ 24′ 30 ” N
Longitude: 77⁰ 08′ 40” E
Panchayath : Seethathodu
Village : Seethathodu
District : Pathanamthitta
River Basin : Pamba 
River : Kullar
Release from Dam to river : Pamba
 Year of completion : 1990
Name of Project : Sabarigiri HEP
Type of Dam : Concrete – Gravity
 Classification : MH (Medium Height)
Maximum Water Level (MWL) : EL 1139.2 m
Full Reservoir Level ( FRL) : EL 1136.9 m
Storage at FRL : 2.78 Mm3
 Height from deepest foundation : 
 Length : 
 Spillway : Ungated- overflow section
 Crest Level : EL 1136.90
River Outlet : 1 No., Circular type, 60 cm diameter

Power Generation
The Sabarigiri Hydroelectric Project generates 300 MW of electricity using 6 turbines of 50 MW each. Annual production is 1338 MU. The Project is the second largest hydro electric project of Kerala State.  The machine was commissioned on November 26, 1967. With continuous upgrades, the capacity was increased from 300 MW to 340 MW by 2009.

External links
 Project Sabarigiri telefilm

References

Dams in Kerala